Laurie Leshin is an American scientist and academic administrator serving as the 10th Director of the NASA Jet Propulsion Laboratory and as Vice President and Bren Professor of Geochemistry and Planetary Science at California Institute of Technology. Leshin's research has focused on geochemistry and space science. Leshin previously served as the 16th president of Worcester Polytechnic Institute.

Education
Leshin earned her Bachelor of Science degree in chemistry from Arizona State University and her M.S. (1989) and Ph.D. (1994) in geochemistry from the California Institute of Technology.

Career
From 1994 to 1996, Leshin was a University of California President's Postdoctoral Fellow in the Department of Earth and Space Sciences at the University of California, Los Angeles (UCLA). From 1996 to 1998, Leshin was the W. W. Rubey Faculty Fellow in the Department of Earth and Space Sciences at UCLA.

From 1998 to 2001, Leshin was an assistant professor at Arizona State University (ASU). In 2001, she became the Dee and John Whiteman Dean’s Distinguished Professor of Geological Sciences at ASU. In 2003, she became the director of ASU's Center for Meteorite Studies, which houses the largest university-based meteorite collection in the world. She directed research, education, and curation activities. At ASU, she also spearheaded the formulation of a new School of Earth and Space Exploration, combining Earth, planetary and astrophysical sciences with systems engineering in a nationally unique interdisciplinary academic unit.

In 2004, Leshin served on President Bush's Commission on Implementation of United States Space Exploration Policy, a nine-member commission charged with advising the President on the execution of his new Vision for Space Exploration.

From 2005 to 2007, Leshin was the director of Sciences and Exploration Directorate at NASA's Goddard Space Flight Center, where she oversaw science activities. From 2008 to 2009, she was the Deputy Center Director for Science & Technology at Goddard. In this position, she oversaw strategy development at the center, leading an inclusive process to formulate future science and technology goals, and an integrated program of investments aligned to meet those goals. With other NASA Goddard senior managers, she was responsible for effectively executing the center's $3 billion in programs, and ensuring the scientific integrity of Earth observing missions, space-based telescopes such as the James Webb Space Telescope, and instruments exploring the Sun, Moon, Mercury, Mars, Saturn, comets and more. Starting in 2010, Leshin served as the deputy associate administrator for NASA’s Exploration Systems Mission Directorate, where she played a leading role in NASA's future human spaceflight endeavors. Her duties included oversight of the planning and execution of the next generation of human exploration systems, as well as the research, robotic and future capabilities development activities that support them. She was also engaged in initiating the development of commercial human spaceflight capabilities to low earth orbit.

From 2011 to 2014, Leshin served as Dean of the School of Science and Professor of Earth & Environmental Science at Rensselaer Polytechnic Institute, where she led the scientific academic and research enterprise. Leshin's scientific expertise is in cosmochemistry, and she is primarily interested in deciphering the record of water on objects in the Solar System.

In February 2013, President Obama appointed her to the advisory board of the Smithsonian National Air and Space Museum, and she was appointed by then Secretary of Transportation Ray LaHood to the advisory board of the United States Merchant Marine Academy later during the same year. She serves on the United States National Research Council's Committee on Astrobiology and Planetary Science, and as chair of the advisory board for the Thriving Earth Exchange of the American Geophysical Union.

In 2014, Leshin became the 16th president of Worcester Polytechnic Institute.

She has published approximately 50 scientific papers.

In January 2022, Leshin was simultaneously appointed as the Director of NASA's Jet Propulsion Laboratory and a vice president and Bren Professor at the California Institute of Technology. WPI announced in February 2022, that Provost and Senior Vice President Wole Soboyejo would serve as interim WPI president upon Leshin's departure in May 2022 while WPI searches for a new president.

Awards
Leshin received the NASA Distinguished Public Service Medal in 2004 for her work on the Presidential Commission and the NASA Outstanding Leadership Medal in 2011 for her work at NASA. In 1996, she was the inaugural recipient of the Meteoritical Society's Nier Prize, awarded for outstanding research in meteoritics or planetary science by a scientist under the age of 35. The International Astronomical Union recognized her contributions to planetary science with the naming of asteroid 4922 Leshin.

References

External links
 WPI Bio
 Leshin’s Profile by the NASA Exploration Systems Mission Directorate

Living people
Rensselaer Polytechnic Institute faculty
Date of birth missing (living people)
American geochemists
Arizona State University alumni
California Institute of Technology alumni
Presidents of Worcester Polytechnic Institute
Planetary scientists
Year of birth missing (living people)